David W. Zucker is a television executive and executive producer, mostly known for producing The Good Wife. He is currently the Chief Creative Officer for Scott Free Productions. He is also the executive producer of notable shows like Eric Garcia’s heist anthology series Kaleidoscope for Netflix; HBO Max’s sci-fi epic, Raised By Wolves; the Paramount+ drama, The Good Fight; the AMC and Britbox investigative revenge series The Beast Must Die; and the National Geographic series The Hot Zone. Zucker's upcoming projects include the FX adaptation of Ridley Scott’s Alien and Steven Knight’s adaptation of the Charles Dickens novel Great Expectations for FX and BBC One.

Career

Zucker worked as a story editor on the CBS television series Judging Amy, wrote pilot scripts for CBS and ABC, as well as various stage plays. He served as Vice President of Drama Series for CBS and Current Programs at Warner Bros. Television.

During his tenure as President of Television, Scott Free Productions has produced a steady stream of highly acclaimed programs, including a 4-season run of Amazon’s adaptation of Philip K. Dick’s The Man in the High Castle; A Christmas Carol for FX &  BBC, starring Guy Pearce; two seasons of the AMC psychological horror series, The Terror; and the Emmy and Golden Globe-nominated, Peabody-winning drama, The Good Wife, which ran on CBS for seven seasons. He has also produced the series adaptation of Justin Cronin’s The Passage, for Fox; the satire Braindead for CBS network; two seasons of the eponymous series adaptation of George Pendle's book Strange Angel on CBS All-Access; Jean-Claude Van Damme’s action-comedy for Amazon, Jean-Claude Van Johnson; two seasons of the esteemed PBS Civil War medical drama, Mercy Street; Numb3rs, which ran for six seasons on CBS; and the acclaimed Emmy-nominated National Geographic channel series of Killing telefilms (Killing Reagan,  Killing Kennedy and Killing Lincoln). Other notable long form programs include Klondike for Discovery Channel; The Pillars of the Earth for Starz, World Without End for Reelz, Into the Storm for HBO, The Andromeda Strain and Coma for A&E, Golden Globe-nominated The Company at TNT, and a feature-length digital series for Xbox/Microsoft, Halo: Nightfall, based on the long-standing video game franchise. Scott Free also produced non-fiction programs including Crimes of the Century and I am Dying for National Geographic, and the longform documentary special Gettysburg for History Channel.

Awards and non-fiction series

During his tenure, Scott Free has produced several acclaimed programs including Starz's eight-hour limited series, Ken Follett's The Pillars of the Earth, an Emmy and Golden Globe nominee, starring Ian McShane, Rufus Sewell and Donald Sutherland, and the subsequent World Without End for Reelz, which won one of its two Emmy nominations. Other shows include HBO's Into the Storm, an Emmy winning sequel to the Emmy-winning telefilm, The Gathering Storm; A&E Emmy-nominated mini-series, Michael Crichton's The Andromeda Strain; and Robin Cook's medical thriller, Coma. TNT's six-hour spy thriller, The Company was a Golden Globe nominee. CBS's drama The Good Wife has been nominated for two Golden Globes for Best Drama.

Scott Free has also produced non-fiction such as two broadcasts in 2013, adaptations of Bill O’Reilly's books Killing Kennedy and Killing Lincoln both delivered good ratings for National Geographic channel, and documentary series, Crimes of the Century, which was featured on CNN. Emmy-winning documentary special, Gettysburg, was also produced for the History Channel.

Credits

These are David W. Zucker's credits according to IMDb:

References

American television producers
Living people
Year of birth missing (living people)
Place of birth missing (living people)